Amy Jane is the third single to be produced by multi-instrumentalist/composer Tim Scott, first released on 9 November 2009.

The cover features a heart sculpted out of a brown paper bag from a fast food chain set in a stripped corrugated cardboard box, shadowed by spotlight, intended to represent how relationships have become more of a disposable commodity in today's society.

Like Guitar Mashing it features a fictional dictionary definition for the term Guitar Mashing which is in part derived from the official Oxford English Dictionary definitions for the words Guitar and Mash but heavily distorted for use as a propaganda tool in marketing the single's unusual genre and so no longer has any true meaning.

The single was recorded and mixed at Acer Studios in Greater Manchester by Tim Scott and mastered on 6 October 2009 by Geoff Pesche  at Abbey Road Studios, London.

Critical reception

Charting at No. 9 in Total Guitar's top 10 recommended tracks to download in the December/Christmas 2009 edition; production editor - Lucy Rice of gave the song a positive review stating: "Refreshing Instrumental mix from mashup man whose guitar heart lies in the party isle of Ibiza" 

Sarah Walters of CityLife gave the song a positive review stating:  "If Cliff can sell pop to Christmas then there’s no reason why Tim Scott can’t flog Steve Vai-type guitar noodling to Ibiza. Backed by a distinctly Judge Jules–like dance beat, Amy Jane is made for mash ups, particularly the track’s howling riff and uber-rock power chords."

Sam Inglis of Sound on Sound (magazine) gave the song a positive review stating: "Tim’s unique brand of ‘Trance/Rock/Progressive house’. Which, it turns out, is rather enjoyable. The production is slick in the extreme, with greater emphasis on ‘real’ instruments than is typical of the trance or house genres. In particular, it’s a neat showcase for Tim’s imaginative and often funky electric guitar playing. It doesn’t fit in the more rigid house and trance templates, but it would be a shame if that denies it club play."

Formats and track listings

CD maxi single

Download single

Personnel

 Tim Scott – lead guitar, rhythm guitar, bass guitar, synth, drums, percussion, drum programming

Production

 Tim Scott – producer, engineer, mixing
 Geoff Pesche – mastering
 Laura Turner – artwork
 Tim Scott – photography

Release history

References

External links
All Music Guide
CD Baby
Discogs
Acer Records Discogs discography

2009 singles
2009 songs